Matas Buzelis is a Lithuanian-American basketball player who currently attends Sunrise Christian Academy.

Early life and high school
Buzelis grew up in Hinsdale, Illinois. Both of his parents played basketball professionally in Lithuania before immigrating to the United States and settling in the Chicago area. Buzelis initially Hinsdale Central High School and played on their junior varsity team as a freshman. He transferred to Brewster Academy, a boarding school in Wolfeboro, New Hampshire, midway through the start of the first semester of his sophomore year after Hinsdale Central's basketball season was postponed due to concerns related to the coronavirus pandemic. As a junior, Buzelis was named the New Hampshire Gatorade Player of the Year after 11.4 points, 5.9 rebounds, 2.1 assists, 1.3 blocks, and 1.2 steals per game. He  was also selected to play for Team World in the 2022 Nike Hoops Summit.

Buzelis transferred to Sunrise Christian Academy in Bel Aire, Kansas before the start of his senior year. Buzelis was selected to play in the 2023 McDonald's All-American Boys Game. He also took part in the Basketball Without Borders camp and was named the camp's MVP.

Recruiting
Buzelis is a consensus five-star recruit and one of the top players in the 2023 class, according to major recruiting services. He ultimately chose to play professionally for NBA G League Ignite. Buzelis had also considered playing college basketball for Kentucky, Duke, North Carolina, Florida State, or Wake Forest.

References

External links
FIBA profile

Living people
American men's basketball players
Basketball players from Illinois
Power forwards (basketball)
American people of Lithuanian descent
Year of birth missing (living people)